Amanda de Lange is a South African politician who has been serving as a Member of the Gauteng Provincial Legislature for the Freedom Front Plus since May 2019. Prior to her election to the legislature, she served as a councillor of the Mogale City Local Municipality.

Political career
De Lange is a member of the Freedom Front Plus. She was re-elected as a councillor of the Mogale City Local Municipality in the 2016 municipal election. She was also wrongly elected a councillor of the West Rand District Municipality. On the day of the district municipality's inaugural council meeting, an IEC official communicated to De Lange that there had been a mistake and that the FF Plus  had no seats on the council. She proceeded to go to the next meeting on 24 August to voice her concerns, but she was forcefully removed from the sitting.

After the 2019 Gauteng provincial election, De Lange was nominated to the Gauteng Provincial Legislature. She was sworn in as a member on 22 May 2019.

Personal life
In May 2018, De Lange's pregnant daughter was assaulted by the then CEO of Novare Consultants.

References

External links

Living people
Year of birth missing (living people)
Afrikaner people
Members of the Gauteng Provincial Legislature
Freedom Front Plus politicians
People from Krugersdorp
21st-century South African politicians
21st-century South African women politicians
Women members of provincial legislatures of South Africa